Apiocera haruspex is a species of fly in the family Apioceridae.

Subspecies
These three subspecies belong to the species Apiocera haruspex:
 Apiocera haruspex haruspex
 Apiocera haruspex martinorum
 Apiocera haruspex oncorhachis Cazier, 1982

References

Asiloidea
Articles created by Qbugbot
Taxa named by Carl Robert Osten-Sacken
Insects described in 1877